Gabriel Briard was a landscape and portrait painter of some grace and facility of hand, the master of Demarne, and just one of the influential painting teachers of Mme. Elisabeth Louise Vigée Le Brun. He visited Italy in 1749, became an Academician in 1768, and died in 1777.

References
 

18th-century French painters
French male painters
Year of birth unknown
1777 deaths
18th-century French male artists